Khabarovsk Border Institute of the FSB of the Russian Federation is a is a federal state educational institution of higher professional education for the training of officers for the Border Service of the Federal Security Service of the Russian Federation.

History
The Khabarovsk Military Institute of the Federal Border Service of the Russian Federation was established on May 5, 1993, in accordance with the Decree № 421 of the Council of Ministers of the Russian Federation, on the basis of the Khabarovsk Higher Military Construction School (founded in 1981).

After the transfer of border agencies to the Federal Security Service, the Khabarovsk Military Institute of the Federal Border Service was renamed the Khabarovsk Border Institute of the Federal Security Service of the Russian Federation by order of the Government of the Russian Federation dated October 24, 2003 № 1535.

References

Military academies of Russia
Educational institutions established in 1993
Soviet Border Troops
Borders of Russia
Federal Security Service
Border control
1981 establishments in the Soviet Union
Khabarovsk

ru:Хабаровский пограничный институт ФСБ России